Ardtaraig is a hamlet lying at the head of Loch Striven on the Cowal peninsula, Argyll and Bute, West of Scotland.  The hamlet is on the single track B836 road.

Cowal Hydro Scheme

The Cowal Hydro Scheme is part of the Sloy/Awe Hydro-Electric Scheme and produces 8MW from the stored waters of Loch Tarsan (artificial reservoir), located close by in Glen Lean.  The generating house is located at Ardtaraig and is supplied by pipe.  The scheme opened in 1951.

History

Ardtaraig Chapel

Ardtaraig Chapel no longer stands, but the foundations are still visible.

World War II

Ardtaraig was known as HMS Varbel II, a secondary base to HMS Varbel, where navigation was taught to the men who manned the midget submarines or X-craft.

References

External links

Villages in Cowal
Highlands and Islands of Scotland